Paca Street Firehouse, also known as Truck House No. 2, is a historic fire station located at Baltimore, Maryland, United States. The architect of Paca Street Firehouse is John E. Lafferty. It is a 1909 two-story brick structure with a highly detailed stone Renaissance Revival  façade. The principal space is a large room subdivided at the Paca Street end into offices. It is one of three early 20th century firehouses standing and is the only one to retain its original features, particularly in the interior.

Paca Street Firehouse was listed on the National Register of Historic Places in 1983.

See also
Fire departments in Maryland
Engine House No. 6 (Baltimore, Maryland)
Engine House No. 8 (Baltimore, Maryland)
Poppleton Fire Station

References

External links
, including photo from 2004, at Maryland Historical Trusthttp://www.nationalregisterofhistoricplaces.com/md/baltimore/vacant.html

Downtown Baltimore
Fire stations completed in 1909
Neoclassical architecture in Maryland
Fire stations on the National Register of Historic Places in Maryland
Government buildings on the National Register of Historic Places in Baltimore
Defunct fire stations in Maryland